Drasteria ingeniculata is a moth of the family Erebidae. It is found in south-central United States (Texas, Oklahoma, Kansas and Nebraska).

The wingspan is about 34 mm. Adults are on wing in spring and again in late summer. There are at least two generations per year.

References

External links

Drasteria
Moths described in 1875
Moths of North America